Loon Prairie 237 is an Indian reserve of the Loon River First Nation in Alberta, located within Northern Sunrise County. It is 30 kilometres north of Loon Lake.

References

Indian reserves in Alberta
Loon River First Nation